Philophobia may refer to:

Philophobia (album), an album by the band Arab Strap
Philophobia (fear), the fear of falling in love